Sofalgaran Rural District is a rural district (dehestan) in Lalejin District, Bahar County, Hamadan Province, Iran. At the 2006 census, its population was 10,587, in 2,469 families. The rural district has 10 villages.

References 

Rural Districts of Hamadan Province
Bahar County